is a railway station on the Kominato Line, in Ichihara, Chiba Prefecture, Japan, operated by the private railway operator Kominato Railway.

Lines
Kazusa-Yamada Station is served by the Kominato Line, and lies 8.6 km from the western terminus of the line at Goi Station.

Station layout
Kazusa-Yamada Station has two opposed side platforms connected to the station building by a level crossing.

Platforms

Adjacent stations

History
It was renamed Kazusa-Yamada Station in January 1954. The station has been unattended since April 16, 2005.

See also
 List of railway stations in Japan

External links

 Kominato Railway Company home page 

Railway stations in Japan opened in 1925
Railway stations in Chiba Prefecture